Sir T. R. A. Thumboo Chetty (Trichinopoly Rayalu Arakiaswamy Thumboo Chetty; April 1837 – 19 June 1907) was an Indian lawyer, administrator, and acting Diwan of Mysore who served the first Indian chief judge of the Chief Court of Mysore.

Early life 
Thumboo Chetty was born in April 1837, to a Catholic family, apparently in Trichinopoly. His father, Desayi Royalu Chetti Garu filled the responsible post of Chief Book-keeper in a Mercantile Firm, Griffith's and Co., and was highly respected in the native Christian community in Madras. His mother was Catherine Ummah, a woman of piety, mildness, courtesy and serenity. He spent his early life in the Black Town, later called George Town, Madras. After his primary education in Madras, where he was taught in the Southern vernaculars Tamil and Telugu, he received his education in English in the famous Free Church Mission Institution, which was later renamed Madras Christian College.

He was the sixth child in his family; he had three elder sisters and one younger brother and a sister, all of whom lived long enough to see his progress and advancement. It is said that his mother prophesied at his birth, "The sixth, being male, will rise to be a great man and rule over people". He had, however, the misfortune to lose both his parents at the early age of twelve. He was brought up, however, with great care and attention, by no less than five executors, to whom the probate of his mother's will was granted by the Madras High Court, the principal of whom, afterwards, became his father-in-law.

Thumboo Chetty married Rajamma, daughter of Ponnoo Chettiar and Sinnammalle, Church of the Blessed Virgin Mary of Refuge, Pophan’s Broadway, Madras. The couple had four sons: T. Rayaloo Chetty, T. Dharma Raj Chetty, T. Sathya Raj Chetty, and T. Thumboo Chetty; and four daughters: Amarapatty  Amma, Sathiavathy Amma, Dhanavathy Amma, and Baghavathy Amma.

His granddaughter (daughter of Sir T. Thumboo Chetty) was the world-renowned violinist Philomena Thumboochetty.

Civil service and law practice 
After leaving school, Thumboo Chetty first apprenticed himself at Mercantile Firm, Griffith's and Co., where his father, Desai Royaloo Chettiar, well versed in accounts, worked as a Chief Bookkeeper. In December 1855, he entered the Public Service as a clerk, then as treasurer, and finally as indexer, in the Office of the Quarter Master General of the Madras Army.

In 1862, Thumboo Chetty became the manager of the first Madras Legislative Council, of which John Dawson Mayne, an eminent barrister, was the Legislative Secretary. While John Mayne was Professor of Law in the Madras Presidency College, Thumboo Chetty was induced to study law. He then joined law classes, and in the final examination held in 1866, he won the first prize for proficiency in law.

Before he joined the Mysore Civil Service, Thumboo Chetty was the a judge in the Court of District Munsiff of Purghi, Bellary, appointed in 1866 by the High Court of Madras. He was soon afterwards appointed sheristadar of the Judicial Commissioner's Court at Bangalore in 1867.

In the year 1879, Thumboo Chetty was appointed District and Sessions Judge of Nandidroog Division, the first Indian to be appointed to this post. He discharged this duty with commendable ability for about five years.

Public office in Mysore Kingdom 
After the Rendition of Mysore which took place in 1881, T. R. A. Thumboo Chetty was nominated ex-officio Senior Member of the Maharaja's Council Chamarajendra Wodayar. In 1884, when the Chief Court of Mysore was constituted, this court being the highest court of appeal in the Mysore Kingdom, T. R. A. Thumboo Chetty was appointed one of its three judges, and subsequently the Chief Judge in July 1890. He, thus became the first Indian Chief Judge of the Chief Court of Mysore. He was invested as a Companion of the Most Eminent Order of the Indian Empire in 1895.

Sir K. Seshadri Iyer was the diwan of Maharaja Chamaraja Wadiyar. During his ministry, Thumboo Chetty officiated for him on three occasions, in 1890, later in 1892, and 1893. In 1894. The sudden demise of the Maharaja Chamarajendra Wodayar and his eldest son Krishnaraja Wadiyar IV was a minor at that time led Mr. T. R. A. Thumboo Chetty's nomination in 1895 as the Senior Member of the Regency Council of Mysore of Maharani Vani Vilasa Sannidhana Kempa Nanjammani Devi.

He was relieved as the Chief Judge on 4 November 1895 and continued to serve as a full-time councillor.

Seshadri Iyer continued to be the Dewan of Mysore during the period of the Regency, during when, Thumboo Chetty officiated twice again, once in 1897, and in 1900. Seshadri Iyer, who had served the state since 1 January 1883, resigned the office of Dewan and President of the State Council, owing to ill-health, on 18 March 1901. On the same date, Thumboo Chetty, Member of the Regency Council, was granted leave preparatory to retirement. Thus happily ended the official career of one who, from humble situations, from a clerk he gradually rose to be the First Indian Chief Judge of the Chief Court of Mysore and the Dewan of one of the principal Native States in British India.

References

External links 
 T. R. A. Thumboo Chetty.
 Diwans take over.
 Luminaries who presided over the High Court

1837 births
1907 deaths
19th-century Indian judges
Diwans of Mysore
20th-century Indian politicians
Politicians from Mysore
People from Tiruchirappalli district